Ficus sagittata is a trailing fig species, in the family Moraceae, which can be found in southern China, Indo-China and Malesia.  In Vietnam it may be called sung dầu tên or sung bò.  No subspecies are listed in the Catalogue of Life.

Gallery

References

External links 
 
 

sagittata
Flora of Indo-China